The 1999 Christchurch Borough Council election took place on 6 May 1999 to elect members of Christchurch Borough Council in Dorset, England. The whole council was up for election and the Conservative Party gained overall control of the council from no overall control.

Election result

By-elections between 1999 and 2003

References

1999
1999 English local elections